Seelong is a small town in Kulai District, Johor, Malaysia. It is nearby the Senai International Airport and Senai Industrial Park.

Transportation
The area is accessible by Muafakat Bus route P-402.

References

Kulai District